Satonius is a genus of beetles in the family Torridincolidae. It is native to East Asia. The type species, S. kurosawai, was originally described as a species of Delevea. Several other species have been described since.

References

Monotypic beetle genera
Myxophaga genera
Beetles described in 1982